Claudio Corti (born 25 June 1987) is a Grand Prix motorcycle racer from Italy. He currently competes in the British National Superstock 1000 Championship aboard a Kawasaki ZX-10R.

Career

Early career
Born in Como, Corti progressed up the motorcycling ladder through the Italian 125GP Championship and by 2004, he had finished as runner-up in the Italian Supersport Championship. In 2005, Corti moved into the European Superstock 600cc Cup, run on the Superbike World Championship support package. Riding for the Trasimeno team, Corti and France's Yoann Tiberio battled for the championship title, with Corti claiming the honours by eight points. He finished his first seven races on the podium, including five victories. He also competed in the Italian Supersport, Superstock and Superbike series; he twice finished as runner-up in the championship in Superstock in 2006 and 2007, and was runner-up in Superbikes in 2008.

Superstock 1000 FIM Cup
After his championship campaign in 2005, Corti moved up into the more powerful 1000cc championship for the 2006 season with Yamaha Team Italia. Four victories was a season-high for all riders, but for Corti, these were his only trips to the podium all season, as Alessandro Polita claimed the title ahead of Corti by a margin of 20 points. Corti continued with Yamaha Team Italia in 2007, and again finished as championship runner-up, this time to Niccolò Canepa, as well as holding off Matteo Baiocco for the runner-up placing.

Corti's 2008 campaign was far from successful however, as he tumbled down the standings to end the season in eleventh place on 57 points, tying with Andrea Antonelli. But he returned to prior form in 2009, as he claimed his third runner-up placing in four seasons, riding a Suzuki for Alstare Racing. Corti won two of the first three races, but was eventually overhauled by the super-consistent placings of Xavier Simeon, who finished all ten races in the top two. Maxime Berger's retirements from three races equally helped Corti to secure second in the championship.

Moto2 World Championship

Corti moved onto the Grand Prix bill, moving into the new-for- Moto2 class. He partnered Jules Cluzel at the Forward Racing team riding Suter motorcycles. Corti was one of the few riders to finish each one of the season's 17 races, although points-scoring finishes were hard to come by due to the expansive nature of the class, with races having around 40 entries each. Corti finished 25th in the championship, with a best result of ninth in San Marino. He also claimed pole position at the British Grand Prix at Silverstone, but finished the race in 30th place.

Career statistics

Grand Prix motorcycle racing

By season

By class

Races by year
(key) (Races in bold indicate pole position)

Superbike World Championship

Races by year

References

External links

MotoGP World Championship riders
Moto2 World Championship riders
Italian motorcycle racers
1987 births
Living people
FIM Superstock 1000 Cup riders
Superbike World Championship riders
Sportspeople from Como